iCarly (or iCarly: The Game) is a 2009 party video game loosely based on the TV series of the same name. The Wii version of the game was developed by Blitz Games, while the Nintendo DS version was developed by Human Soft. The game was released in North America for the Nintendo DS on October 27, 2009, and for the Wii on October 20, 2009. Both versions were also released in Europe and Australia on November 6, 2009.

A sequel, iCarly 2: iJoin the Click!, was released for the Wii and Nintendo DS on November 16, 2010.

Development and release 
In May 2009, Activision announced they had partnered with Nickelodeon to create an iCarly game for the Wii and Nintendo DS to be released in fall of that year. The game was released in October 2009, with David Oxford of Activision Publishing describing it as "an energetic gameplay experience that is non-stop entertainment" and Steve Youngwood of Nickelodeon saying it would "tap[...] into kids' creativity to provide them with endless fun."

Gameplay
Based on the TV series, iCarly is about a girl named Carly Shay who creates her own web show called iCarly with her best friends Sam and Freddie. Carly's videos that are uploaded on the iCarly site are being deleted, and it turns out that Nevel has taken down their website. So Carly and her friends have to get their website back by playing 10 minigames, presented as show skits, and they allow players to work with the characters through new adventures. The iCreate mode lets players add their own touches to the webisodes by swapping out props, characters, color schemes, audio, intros, outros and other elements. Up to four players can either compete or cooperate to complete the skits and earn Web-Creds, which can then be used to purchase new items, props, accessories and locations from in-game websites.

The Wii version of the game allows for up to four players at once.

Reception
Common Sense Media commented in their review that the contained mini-games were "genuinely fun, easy to learn but hard to master", but that "there just aren't enough of them, which leads to a lot of repetition" Digital Spy praised the game's voice acting and story, but criticized the gameplay as "slightly repetitive", the customization as "rather surface level", the game as having "limited substance".

References

External links 

 
 
iCarly (Wii) at MobyGames
iCarly (Nintendo DS) at MobyGames

2009 video games
Activision games
Minigame compilations
Multiplayer and single-player video games
Nickelodeon video games
Nintendo DS games
Video games developed in the United Kingdom
Video games featuring female protagonists
Wii games
ICarly
Video games based on television series
Video games set in the 2000s
Video games set in Seattle
Video games developed in the United States
Blitz Games Studios games